Bettina Muscheidt was the ambassador of the European Union to Nicaragua and previously served as the ambassador to Yemen and Libya.

In September 2022, Nicaragua declared her persona non grata and asked her to leave. The declaration came days after Charles Michel, EU delegate to the UN, Condemned the government of Nicaragua and urged President Daniel Ortega to “restore democracy.”  As a result, she was expelled due to "interference and disrespect for national sovereignty.". She left the country on October 1, 2022 which was three days after being asked to leave.

Biography
Muscheidt has a graduate degree from the Fletcher School of Law and Diplomacy in 2001 and Master in Agricultural and Development Economics from the University of Bonn.

References

Women ambassadors
The Fletcher School at Tufts University alumni
Ambassadors of the European Union to Yemen
Ambassadors of the European Union to Libya
Ambassadors of the European Union to Nicaragua
University of Bonn alumni
Year of birth missing (living people)
Living people